Billy Mercer may refer to:
 Billy Mercer (footballer, born 1892) (1892–1956), former Hull City, Huddersfield Town and Blackpool goalkeeper
 Billy Mercer (footballer, born 1896) (1896–1975), former Preston North End, Blackpool, Lancaster Town and Boston Town player
 Billy Mercer (footballer, born 1969), former Rotherham United and Chesterfield player, now goalkeeping coach at Burnley FC
 Billy Mercer (musician), bassist for Strays Don't Sleep

See also
 William Mercer (disambiguation)
 Bill Mercer (born 1926), American sportscaster